Double Live is the first live album by American country music singer Garth Brooks. It was released on November 17, 1998, and is a two-disc compilation of live songs, recorded during Brooks's 1996–98 world tour.

The album broke the first-week sales record at the time, previously held by Pearl Jam's Vs., when it sold 1,085,000 copies. It became the best-selling live album in the US since Eric Clapton's Unplugged in 1992, later becoming the best-selling live album in United States music history. It has been certified 21× Platinum by the RIAA (10.5 million shipped as it is a double album), and is the seventh most shipped album in the US. By 2012, it had sold 6,017,000 copies.

Double Live was re-released on September 5, 2014, as Double Live: 25th Anniversary Edition, exclusive to GhostTunes.

Double Live was again re-released on November 20, 2018, as part of the Garth Brooks Anthology Part III: Live book.

Content
The song "Tearin' It Up (And Burnin' It Down)" was originally slated for Brooks's 1997 album Sevens, and "Wild as the Wind" was intended for a duets album with Trisha Yearwood.

Track listing

Original Release

Disc one 
 "Callin' Baton Rouge" (Dennis Linde)  – 2:58
 "Two of a Kind, Workin' on a Full House" (Warren Haynes, Dennis Robbins, Bobby Boyd)  – 2:44
 "Shameless" (Billy Joel)  – 3:55
 "Papa Loved Mama" (Kim Williams, Garth Brooks)  – 2:51
 "The Thunder Rolls (The Long Version)" (Pat Alger, Brooks)  – 4:48
 "We Shall Be Free" (Stephanie Davis, Brooks)  – 4:43
 "Unanswered Prayers" (Alger, Larry Bastian, Brooks)  – 3:41
 "Standing Outside the Fire" (Jenny Yates, Brooks)  – 3:43
 "Longneck Bottle" (Rick Carnes, Steve Wariner)  – 2:42
feat. Steve Wariner
 "It's Your Song" (Pam Wolfe, Benita Hill)  – 4:18
 "Much Too Young (To Feel This Damn Old)" (Randy Taylor, Brooks)  – 3:12
 "The River" (Victoria Shaw, Brooks)  – 3:48
 (Untitled Track) – 0:061
 "Tearin' It Up (And Burnin' It Down)" (Kent Blazy, Williams, Brooks)  – 3:56
1Track 13 is six seconds of crowd noise, added to make the final track on this disc #14.

Disc two 
 "Ain't Goin' Down ('Til the Sun Comes Up)" (Williams, Blazy, Brooks) – 4:45
 "Rodeo" (Bastian) – 3:44
 "The Beaches of Cheyenne" (Dan Roberts, Bryan Kennedy, Brooks) – 3:51
 "Two Piña Coladas" (Shawn Camp, Hill, Sandy Mason) – 4:38
 "Wild as the Wind" (Pete Wasner, Charles John Quarto) – 4:13
featuring Trisha Yearwood
 "To Make You Feel My Love" (Bob Dylan) – 3:17
 "That Summer" (Alger, Sandy Mahl, Brooks) – 4:42
 "American Honky-Tonk Bar Association" (Kennedy, Jim Rushing) – 4:05
 "If Tomorrow Never Comes" (Blazy, Brooks) – 3:44
 "The Fever" (Steven Tyler, Joe Perry, Kennedy, Roberts) – 3:40
 "Friends in Low Places (The Long Version)" (Earl "Bud" Lee, DeWayne Blackwell) – 8:56
 "The Dance" (Tony Arata) – 3:56

25th Anniversary Edition Release

Disc one 
 "Callin' Baton Rouge" (Dennis Linde)  – 2:58
 "Two of a Kind, Workin' on a Full House" (Warren Haynes, Dennis Robbins, Bobby Boyd)  – 2:44
 "Shameless" (Billy Joel)  – 3:55
 "Papa Loved Mama" (Kim Williams, Garth Brooks)  – 2:51
 "More Than a Memory" (Lee Brice, Billy Montana, Kyle Jacobs) – 3:29
 "The Thunder Rolls (The Long Version)" (Pat Alger, Brooks)  – 4:48
 "We Shall Be Free" (Stephanie Davis, Brooks)  – 4:43
 "Unanswered Prayers" (Alger, Larry Bastian, Brooks)  – 3:41
 "Standing Outside the Fire" (Jenny Yates, Brooks)  – 3:43
 "Longneck Bottle" (Rick Carnes, Steve Wariner)  – 2:42
feat. Steve Wariner
 "It's Your Song" (Pam Wolfe, Benita Hill)  – 4:18
 "Much Too Young (To Feel This Damn Old)" (Randy Taylor, Brooks)  – 3:12
 "Workin' for a Livin'" (Duet with Huey Lewis) (Huey Lewis, Chris Hayes) – 3:22
 "The River" (Victoria Shaw, Brooks)  – 3:48
 "Tearin' It Up (And Burnin' It Down)" (Kent Blazy, Williams, Brooks)  – 3:56

Disc two 
 "Ain't Goin' Down ('Til the Sun Comes Up)" (Williams, Blazy, Brooks) – 4:45
 "Heart in New York" (Benny Gallagher, Graham Lyle) – 1:21
 "Rodeo" (Bastian) – 3:44
 "The Beaches of Cheyenne" (Dan Roberts, Bryan Kennedy, Brooks) – 3:51
 "Two Piña Coladas" (Shawn Camp, Hill, Sandy Mason) – 4:38
 "Wild as the Wind" (Pete Wasner, Charles John Quarto) – 4:13
featuring Trisha Yearwood
 "Good Ride Cowboy" (Jerrod Niemann, Bryan Kennedy, Richie Brown and Bob Doyle) – 3:40
 "To Make You Feel My Love" (Bob Dylan) – 3:17
 "That Summer" (Alger, Sandy Mahl, Brooks) – 4:42
 "American Honky-Tonk Bar Association" (Kennedy, Jim Rushing) – 4:05
 "Wrapped Up In You" (Wayne Kirkpatrick) – 4:26
 "If Tomorrow Never Comes" (Blazy, Brooks) – 3:44
 "The Fever" (Steven Tyler, Joe Perry, Kennedy, Roberts) – 3:40
 "Friends in Low Places (The Long Version)" (Earl "Bud" Lee, DeWayne Blackwell) – 8:56
 "The Dance" (Tony Arata) – 3:56

Anthology Part III: Live Edition Release

Disc one 
 "Callin' Baton Rouge" (Dennis Linde)  – 2:58
 "Two of a Kind, Workin' on a Full House" (Warren Haynes, Dennis Robbins, Bobby Boyd)  – 2:44
 "Shameless" (Billy Joel)  – 3:55
 "Papa Loved Mama" (Kim Williams, Garth Brooks)  – 2:51
 "More Than a Memory" (Lee Brice, Billy Montana, Kyle Jacobs) – 3:29
 "The Thunder Rolls (The Long Version)" (Pat Alger, Brooks)  – 4:48
 "We Shall Be Free" (Stephanie Davis, Brooks)  – 4:43
 "Unanswered Prayers" (Alger, Larry Bastian, Brooks)  – 3:41
 "Standing Outside the Fire" (Jenny Yates, Brooks)  – 3:43
 "Longneck Bottle" (Rick Carnes, Steve Wariner)  – 2:42
feat. Steve Wariner
 "It's Your Song" (Pam Wolfe, Benita Hill)  – 4:18
 "Much Too Young (To Feel This Damn Old)" (Randy Taylor, Brooks)  – 3:12
 "The River" (Victoria Shaw, Brooks)  – 3:48
 "Tearin' It Up (And Burnin' It Down)" (Kent Blazy, Williams, Brooks)  – 3:56

Disc two 
 "Ain't Goin' Down ('Til the Sun Comes Up)" (Williams, Blazy, Brooks) – 4:45
 "Rodeo" (Bastian) – 3:44
 "The Beaches of Cheyenne" (Dan Roberts, Bryan Kennedy, Brooks) – 3:51
 "Two Piña Coladas" (Shawn Camp, Hill, Sandy Mason) – 4:38
 "Wild as the Wind" (Pete Wasner, Charles John Quarto) – 4:13
featuring Trisha Yearwood
 "To Make You Feel My Love" (Bob Dylan) – 3:17
 "That Summer" (Alger, Sandy Mahl, Brooks) – 4:42
 "American Honky-Tonk Bar Association" (Kennedy, Jim Rushing) – 4:05
 "If Tomorrow Never Comes" (Blazy, Brooks) – 3:44
 "The Fever" (Steven Tyler, Joe Perry, Kennedy, Roberts) – 3:40
 "Friends in Low Places (The Long Version)" (Earl "Bud" Lee, DeWayne Blackwell) – 8:56
 "The Dance" (Tony Arata) – 3:56

Personnel
Per liner notes included with the album's release.

Musicians

 Susan Ashton — backing vocals
 Bob Bailey — backing vocals, choir
 Bruce Bouton — pedal steel guitar
 Garth Brooks — vocals, acoustic guitar
 Mark Casstevens — acoustic guitar
 Lisa Cochran — choir
 Stephanie Davis — acoustic guitar, backing vocals
 Mike Elred — choir
 Ty England — acoustic guitar
 Béla Fleck — banjo
 David Gant — keyboards
 James Garver — electric guitar, backing vocals
 Mark Greenwood — bass guitar, backing vocals
 Vicki Hampton — backing vocals, choir
 Mark Ivey — choir
 Marabeth Jordan — choir
 Gordon Kennedy — electric guitar
 John Kinsch — electric guitar
 Chris Leuzinger — electric guitar
 Jimmy Mattingly — fiddle, mandolin, acoustic guitar
 Steve McClure — electric guitar, pedal steel guitar
 Donna McElroy — backing vocals
 Terry McMillan — harmonica
 Debbie Nims — acoustic guitar, mandolin, backing vocals
 Mike Palmer — drums
 Victoria Shaw — backing vocals
 Lisa Silver — choir
 Betsy Smittle — bass guitar
 Keith Urban — electric guitar
 Cindy Walker — choir
 Steve Wariner — acoustic guitar, backing vocals on "Longneck Bottle"
 Bergen White — choir
 Dennis Wilson — choir
 Bobby Wood — keyboards
 Trisha Yearwood — vocals on "Wild As The Wind", choir
 Nashville String Machine — string orchestra

Production
 Guy Charbonneau – engineer
 Carlos Grier – digital editing
 John Harris – engineer
 Joe Loesch - sound design
 Mark Miller – engineer, mixing engineer
 Denny Purcell – mastering engineer
 John Saylor – engineer
 Steve Smith – engineer

Album cover themes
The album was originally released November 17, 1998, with a commemorative cover. In each of the next six weeks, another commemorative cover was released, each themed with one of Brooks' live performances.

Variations released since the original issue include a First Edition cover, Reunion Arena '91, Texas Stadium '93, World Tour I, World Tour II, Central Park '97, Dublin '98, USS Enterprise '01, The Last Show, Off-Stage and, in 2014, the 25th Anniversary Edition was released including a new cover, additional bonus tracks and a DVD to promote the digital remaster and release of Brook's digital music via GhostTunes.

Chart performance
Double Live debuted at number 1 on the US Billboard 200, becoming Brooks' seventh, and number 1 on the Top Country Albums, Brooks' ninth number one Country album. In November 2006, Double Live was certified 21× Platinum by the RIAA.

Charts

Weekly charts

Year-end charts

Decade-end charts

Certifications

Singles
"It's Your Song" was re-recorded in the studio and released as a single, peaking at #9 in late 1998. Two of the album's other tracks charted on the Billboard charts in 1998 from unsolicited airplay.

See also
List of best-selling albums in the United States

References

Garth Brooks albums
Albums produced by Allen Reynolds
1998 live albums
Capitol Records live albums

pt:Double Live